YART (Yamaha Austria Racing Team) is a World Endurance Championship racing team based in Heimschuh, Styria, Austria. YART is also one of three official GYTR (Genuine Yamaha Technology Racing) Pro Shops in Europe, alongside Crescent Racing in UK and Ten Kate Racing in the Netherlands. YART was founded in 2001 by Mandy Kainz; it finished runner up in 2006 and 2008 and won the 2009 FIM Endurance World Championship. 

In 2020 Yamaha Motor Europe and YART unveiled a limited edition Petronas Yamaha SRT replica YZF-R1. The 46 machines have been commissioned to celebrate 46 years of Petronas oil business and will cost €46,000 each. The bikes are available to European customers only.

Achievements
 2006 – Endurance Vice Worldchampions on Yamaha
 2008 – Endurance Vice Worldchampions on Yamaha
 2009 – Endurance Worldchampions on Yamaha
 2019/20 – Endurance Vice Worldchampions on Yamaha
 10 Victories in FIM Endurance World Championship
 15 Pole-Positions in FIM Endurance World Championship
 14 Fastest Racelaps in FIM Endurance World Championship
 36 Podiumsfinishes FIM Endurance World Championship

EWC-Season in numbers

Endurance WM results

Team Crew

References

External links
Yamaha Austria official website

Motorcycle racing teams
Motorcycle racing teams established in 2001
2001 establishments in Austria